MobyMax is an online education program used by grades K-8. MobyMax includes 27 subjects including math, reading, phonics, language, vocabulary, spelling, writing, science, social studies, preparations for state examinations and more. The program also provides classroom tools such as assessments and progress monitoring, and also offers games, badges, and contests for the students.  

MobyMax is used by 82% of K-8 schools in the United States, with 22 million students registered by teachers.

History 
MobyMax was founded in 2010 by Glynn Willett and his son, Wade Willett. Glynn was previously been the co-founder of ATX, a tax preparation software company. Moby Math was originally intended to find and fix skill gaps in the learning of special education students, but has been utilized in other classes as well. 

The company expanded the program in 2013 to include Language, Reading, and Vocabulary.

In 2015, MobyMax launched Cognitive Skills Science, which uses 20,000 cognitive skill manipulatives to teach science. That same year, the company launched a trio of Early Reading modules, followed by Cognitive Skill Social Studies and seven early phonics modules in 2016.

In 2018, MobyMax created Pinpoint Assessments with Skill Checker and Benchmarker tests for Math, Language, Foundational Reading, and Reading. 

In 2020, the company released its new software update to help parents with homeschooling as well as tutoring. This new sofware, MobyMax Families, arrived shortly after the COVID-19 pandemic hit. “We need to limit the toll that the COVID-19 is taking on our children’s education,” said MobyMax co-founder Glynn Willett. “MobyMax Families was created for parents who want to stop COVID slide in its tracks." This new addition also comes in a family-specific subscription, with access to 1.5 million teachers, K-8.

Reception 
In 2016, the Software and Information Industry Association (SIIA) named MobyMax a finalist for Best Science Instructional Solution. The next year SIIA named MobyMax the Best PreK/Early Childhood Learning Solution and Best Education Cloud-Based Solution.

In 2020, since the release of MobyMax Families, the company has seen a rise in positive feedback from parents. MobyMax was also named the most awarded educational technology solution provider in the US, in addition to its helpfulness in schools and at home.

References 

Virtual learning environments
American children's websites
American educational websites
Education companies established in 2010
Internet properties established in 2010
Companies based in Pittsburgh
2010 establishments in Pennsylvania